Žarko Grabovač (born 16 June 1983) is a Serbian former professional footballer who played as a striker. Remarkably, he also played as a centre back in the past, mainly during his stay with Fortuna Sittard.

Early and personal life
Born in Ruma, SFR Yugoslavia, Grabovač came to the Netherlands at early age and also holds Dutch citizenship.

Career
Grabovač spent ten years with JVC Cuijk, before later playing as an amateur for TOP Oss, Ronse and Geldrop/AEK, before moving to England to play for Blackpool in January 2005. Grabovač made three appearances in the Football League for Blackpool, his only first-team appearances for the club, before being released at the end of the 2004–05 campaign. Grabovač returned to the Netherlands, signing with Fortuna Sittard for the 2005–06 season. In 2011, he moved to Helmond Sport

References

1983 births
Living people
Serbian footballers
Dutch footballers
Dutch people of Serbian descent
TOP Oss players
Blackpool F.C. players
Fortuna Sittard players
Helmond Sport players
Willem II (football club) players
Eerste Divisie players
Challenger Pro League players
English Football League players
Expatriate footballers in Belgium
Expatriate footballers in England
People from Ruma
Association football forwards